Natalia Davidovici (born 17 November 1971) is a Moldovan politician and journalist who currently serves in the Parliament of Moldova. She also serves as presidential adviser to President Maia Sandu on interethnic issues.

Controversies
Although she is a member of the pro-European PAS party, some of her statements have been interpreted by the Moldovan press as being pro-Russian and anti-Romanian (such as the Romanian occupation of Bessarabia, the support for the legitimacy of the separatist regime in Transnistria or her links with the pro-Russian politician Renato Usatîi).

References 

Living people
Members of the parliament of Moldova
1971 births
Moldovan people of Russian descent